Hamizan Hisham (born 10 November 2001) is a Singaporean footballer currently playing as a defender for Tampines Rovers.

He was nominated for the Dollah Salleh award in 2016 but failed to win it. 

He has a training stint with Matsumoto Yamaga in 2015.

Career statistics

Club

Notes

International Statistics
He was called up to the 2018 AFF Under-19 C'ship campaign squad.

U19 International caps

References

Living people
2001 births
Singaporean footballers
Association football midfielders
Singapore Premier League players
Young Lions FC players
Tampines Rovers FC players